Wedding Anniversary is an Indian Hindi-language romantic drama film, directed by Shekhar S Jha, produced by Kumar V Mahant and Achut Naik, and presented by Bharat Shah. The film stars Nana Patekar and Mahie Gill in leading roles and was released on 24 February 2017.

Plot
 
Kahani (Mahie Gill) and her husband Nirbhay (Priyanshu Chatterjee) had planned to celebrate their wedding anniversary in Goa but due to some last minute work Nirbhay stays back and Kahani has to travel alone. While she waits for her husband in Goa, she picks up a book to read written by her favourite author Nagarjun (Nana Patekar) and after a short while a visitor rings the doorbell of her house who turns out to be none other than Nagarjun himself. The conversation that follows between the two of them where Nagarjun talks about love, its true meaning and the relevance it has in our lives forms the crux of this film's story.

Cast

 Nana Patekar as Nagarjun
 Mahi Gill as Kahani 
 Priyanshu Chatterjee as Nirbhay
 Sanket Choukse
 Shruti Marathe
 Priya Tandon in a cameo appearance
 Asma Badar
 Kanika Dang
 Sneha Gupta
 Bhumika Gurung
 Yatin Karyekar
 Asad Khan
 Krishanu
 Abhishek Ray
 Rahul Prakash
 Shanti Bhushan Roy
 Neha Sharma
 Shruti Sharma
 Bhupesh Singh
 Yajuvendra Singh
 Tamara
 Tejan Yadav

Production

Filming

The entire shooting of the film was done in Goa in May and June 2015.

Soundtrack

The music for the film is composed by Abhishek Ray, while the lyrics have been penned by Abhiruchi & Manvendra. 
The music rights are bought by Zee Music Company.

Critical reception

Mihir Bhanage of The Times of India found the film to be boring and gave it a rating of 2 out of 5 saying that, "If you have issues in your love-life, visit a marriage counsellor. Wedding Anniversary will only add some phrases to your Hindi/ Urdu vocabulary." Nandini Ramnath of Scroll said that, "‘Wedding Anniversary’ is as much fun as a divorce hearing". Vishal Verma of Glamsham gave the film a rating of 1 out of 5 and said that, "Wedding Anniversary is an unintentional horror that makes us wonder what on earth are talents like Nana Patekar and Mahie Gill doing in this flick?"

References

External links
 

2017 romantic drama films
Films scored by Abhishek Ray
Indian romantic drama films
Indian romantic musical films
2017 films
Indian historical romance films
UTV Motion Pictures films
Films shot in Goa
2010s historical romance films
2010s romantic musical films